S. R. Balasubramaniam is an Indian politician and former Member of the Legislative Assembly of Tamil Nadu. He was elected to the Tamil Nadu legislative assembly as an Indian National Congress candidate from Pongalur constituency in 1989 and 1991 elections. After being an MLA he was elected as the central minister. He was also an elected member of  the Parliament in Lok Sabha from Nilgiris constituency from 1996 to 1998. Currently he is a member of ADMK. He is the current Member of Parliament in Rajyasabha on behalf of AIADMK. 

The analysis of attendance of the MPs in the Parliament's Upper House revealed that AIADMK member SR Balasubramaniam is the most regular Rajya Sabha member, clocking 100% attendance in the 7 sessions during 2021. He participated in the proceedings of all the 138 sittings of the 7 sessions, according to the study.

References 

Indian National Congress politicians from Tamil Nadu
Living people
Leaders of the Opposition in Tamil Nadu
All India Anna Dravida Munnetra Kazhagam politicians
Tamil Maanila Congress politicians
Year of birth missing (living people)
Tamil Nadu MLAs 1991–1996
Tamil Nadu politicians